Kyle Godwin (born 30 July 1992) is a Zimbabwean born Australian rugby union footballer. His regular playing position is centre. He currently represents Western Force in Super Rugby AU.

Godwin was part of the Australia under 20 team that competed in the 2012 IRB Junior World Championship in South Africa.
Godwin made his Wallaby debut (Wallaby #903) in 2016 against the French.

Super Rugby
In 2012, Godwin made his Super Rugby debut for the Western Force against the Queensland Reds in Perth.
He went on to play 52 games for the Western Force before moving to the Brumbies. During his time at the Force, he won Rookie of the Year, Members Most Valuable Player and the Nathan Sharpe Medal. He moved to Canberra in 2016 to play for the Brumbies where he played 24 games over two seasons.

Pro 14 Rugby
On 20 March 2018, it was announced that Godwin was to play in the Pro 14 having signed for Connacht Rugby for the 2018/19 season. The contract being of two-year duration initially.

On successful completion of his two-year contract with Connacht, the popular Aussie returned to Australia by signing again for Western Force in Perth.

Playing statistics

Super Rugby

References

External links 
Western Force profile
Brumbies Profile
IRB profile

1992 births
Australia international rugby union players
Australian rugby union players
Zimbabwean rugby union players
Zimbabwean people of British descent
Western Force players
ACT Brumbies players
Rugby union fly-halves
White Zimbabwean sportspeople
Zimbabwean emigrants to Australia
People educated at Aquinas College, Perth
Sportsmen from Western Australia
Connacht Rugby players
Living people
Sportspeople from Harare
New South Wales Country Eagles players
Perth Spirit players
Rugby union players from Perth, Western Australia
Rugby union centres
Lyon OU players